Musfiquh Kalam (birth 1 May 2002) is a South African table tennis player.

Background 
Kalam attended Trafalgar High School in Cape Town, South Africa. She became a women's champion at the age of 12. She has won the women's singles title at the Southern African Regional Championships twice.

Championships

References 

2002 births
Living people
South African female table tennis players
Sportspeople from Cape Town
Alumni of Trafalgar High School (Cape Town)
21st-century South African women